Capi or CAPI may refer to:

Computing
 Common Application Programmer's Interface, LispWorks Common Lisp GUI toolkit
 Common ISDN Application Programming Interface,  Common ISDN API
 Computer-assisted personal interviewing, a surveying technique that uses a computer based questionnaire
 Microsoft Cryptographic Application Programming Interface, an interface to a library of functions software developers can call upon for security and cryptography services
 Coherent Accelerator Processor Interface, a bus technology introduced in IBM's POWER8.

People
 Capi (footballer, born 1977), Jesús Capitán Prado, Spanish football midfielder
 Capi (footballer, born 1979), Jesús Tablado Feito, Spanish football forward
 Capi (footballer, born 1981), Manuel Borja Calvar Simón, Spanish football defender

Other uses
 Cash Assistance Program for Immigrants, a service for immigrants in the US not eligible for Supplemental Security Income (SSI)
 Capi, daily newspaper from Nagaland, India

See also 
 Cappi
 Kapi (disambiguation)